Nongo-Souala is a village rural commune in the Cercle of Sikasso in the Sikasso Region of southern Mali. The commune covers an area of 264 square kilometers and includes four villages. In the 2009 census it had a population of 4,578. The village of Nongo-Souala, the administrative center (chef-lieu) of the commune, is 50 km north of Sikasso.

References

External links
. Note that some of the text in this document confuses the commune of Nongo-Souala with that of Natien.

Communes of Sikasso Region